Rankin is a nominal community in Renfrew County, Ontario, Canada.

Communities in Renfrew County